Ben-Zion Harel (3 June 1892 – 19 September 1972) was an Israeli doctor and politician, who served as a member of the Knesset for the General Zionists between 1951 and 1959.

Biography
Born Ben-Zion Hirshowitz in Kuldīga in the Russian Empire (today in Latvia), Harel was educated at a heder and high school, before moving to Switzerland to attend university. He studied chemistry at the University of Zurich, and medicine at the University of Bern, graduating as a doctor in 1916. During his time as a student he became involved in Zionist organisations.

In 1921, he made aliyah to Mandatory Palestine, and from 1922 until 1934 worked as a doctor in kibbutz Ein Harod. He established and served as director of the Jezreel Valley central hospital, and was the head doctor at Kupat Holim in the north of the country. In 1935, he became chairman of the Land of Israel Physicians Association, and the following year helped establish Assuta hospital in Tel Aviv.

Between 1940 and 1941 he was placed in charge of Emergency Health Affairs by the Jewish National Council. Following independence in 1948, he served as director general of the Ministry of Health until 1950, also helping to establish Elisha Hospital in Haifa. In 1951 he was elected to the Knesset on the General Zionists list. He was re-elected in 1955, but lost his seat in the 1959 elections. He died in 1972 at the age of 80.

See also
Health care in Israel

References

External links

1892 births
1972 deaths
Latvian Jews
People from Kuldīga
University of Zurich alumni
University of Bern alumni
Emigrants from the Russian Empire to Switzerland
Israeli emergency physicians
Israeli civil servants
Members of the 2nd Knesset (1951–1955)
Members of the 3rd Knesset (1955–1959)
General Zionists politicians
Soviet emigrants to Mandatory Palestine
Israeli healthcare managers
20th-century Israeli physicians